Khosrow Parvizi (1933 – 2012)  was an Iranian director.

Filmography
1974: Khoshgela Avazi Gereftin
1971: Looti 
1971: The Bridge 
1968: Keshtye Noah 
1968: Seke do rou 
1965: The Mountain Tiger 
1963: The Bitter Earth 
1962: The Last Hurdle 
1962: A Girl Is Screaming 
1961: Fire and Ashes (Atash va Khakestat)
1960: Quiter Before the Storm 
1959: Those Without Stars

References

Iranian film directors
1933 births
2012 deaths
Iranian emigrants to the United States
People from Abadan, Iran
Iranian film editors
Iranian film producers
Iranian screenwriters